The 2014–15 San Antonio Spurs season was the 48th season of the franchise, 39th in the National Basketball Association (NBA) and 42nd in the San Antonio area.  The Spurs were the defending NBA Champions, having defeated the Miami Heat in the 2014 NBA Finals 4 games to 1 and winning their fifth NBA championship, and made Tim Duncan the second player in NBA history to win championships in 3 different decades (The first being John Salley). On April 3, 2015 after their victory over the Denver Nuggets they clinched a 50+ win season for the 16th consecutive season. The Spurs started the season slow and exceeded their previous season of 20 losses, but managed an eleven-game winning streak within the last 12 games and finished 55–27, finishing third in the Southwest on a tie breaker to the Memphis Grizzlies.

In the playoffs, the Spurs faced the Los Angeles Clippers in the First Round. The Spurs' season would end in a Game 7 loss, after Chris Paul made a layup with 1 second on the clock and Matt Barnes blocking a desperate final inbound pass as time expired, losing 109–111. It was the first time since 2011 where the Spurs were eliminated in the first round, where they were eliminated by the 8th-seeded Memphis Grizzlies in a shocking upset. The team hired former WNBA point guard Becky Hammon as an assistant head coach, making her the first full-time female assistant coach in the NBA.

Preseason

Draft picks

Roster

Regular season

Standings

Game log

Regular season

|- style="background:#cfc;"
| 1 
| October 28
| Dallas
| 
| Tony Parker (23)
| Tim Duncan (13)
| Manu Ginóbili (6)
| AT&T Center19,615
| 1–0
|- style="background:#fcc;"
| 2
| October 31
| @ Phoenix
| 
| Tony Parker (19)
| Tim Duncan (9)
| Tony Parker (6)
| US Airways Center15,050
| 1–1

|- style="background:#cfc;"
| 3
| November 5
| Atlanta
|  
| Tim Duncan (17)
| Tim Duncan (13)
| Tony Parker (7)
| AT&T Center18,581
| 2–1
|- style="background:#fcc;"
| 4
| November 6
| @ Houston
|  
| Cory Joseph (18)
| Aron Baynes (12)
| Kawhi Leonard (5)
| Toyota Center18,311
| 2–2
|- style="background:#fcc;"
| 5
| November 8
| New Orleans
|  
| Tony Parker (28)
| Kawhi Leonard (14)
| Tony Parker (4)
| AT&T Center18,581
| 2–3
|- style="background:#cfc;"
| 6
| November 10
| @ L.A. Clippers
|  
| Kawhi Leonard (26)
| Tim Duncan (11)
| Tony Parker (5)
| Staples Center19,313
| 3–3
|- style="background:#cfc;"
| 7
| November 11
| @ Golden State
|  
| Tony Parker (28)
| Tim Duncan (13)
| Tony Parker (7)
| Oracle Arena19,596
| 4–3
|- style="background:#cfc;"
| 8
| November 14
| @ L.A. Lakers
| 
| Cory Joseph (14)
| Tim Duncan (11)
| Tony Parker (9)
| STAPLES Center18,997
| 5–3
|- style="background:#fcc;"
| 9
| November 15
| @ Sacramento
| 
| Manu Ginóbili (21)
| Tim Duncan, Boris Diaw (8)
| Tony Parker (6)
| Sleep Train Arena17,317
| 5–4
|- style="background:#cfc;"
| 10
| November 17
| Philadelphia
| 
| Matt Bonner (18)
| Kawhi Leonard (11)
| Tony Parker (5)
| AT&T Center18,581 
| 6–4
|- style="background:#cfc;"
| 11
| November 19
| @ Cleveland
| 
| Tim Duncan, Boris Diaw (19)
| Tim Duncan, Kawhi Leonard (10)
| Boris Diaw (7)
| Quicken Loans Arena20,562
| 7–4
|- style="background:#cfc;"
| 12
| November 21
| @ Minnesota
| 
| Tony Parker (28)
| Austin Daye (11)
| Tony Parker (5)
| Target Center12,414
| 8–4
|- style="background:#cfc;"
| 13
| November 22
| Brooklyn
| 
| Tony Parker (22)
| Tim Duncan (10)
| Tim Duncan (7)
| AT&T Center18,581
| 9–4
|- style="background:#cfc;"
| 14
| November 26
| Indiana
| 
| Manu Ginóbili (28)
| Kawhi Leonard (13)
| Tony Parker (6)
| AT&T Center18,581
| 10–4
|- style="background:#cfc;"
| 15
| November 28
| Sacramento
| 
| Tony Parker (27)
| Tim Duncan (8)
| Tony Parker, Manu Ginóbili (16)
| AT&T Center18,581
| 11–4
|- style="background:#cfc;"
| 16
| November 30
| @ Boston
| 
| Danny Green (18)
| Tim Duncan (8)
| Tony Parker (9)
| TD Garden17,121
| 12–4

|- style="background:#cfc;"
| 17
| December 1
| @ Philadelphia
| 
| Kawhi Leonard (26)
| Kawhi Leonard (10)
| Cory Joseph (6)
| Wells Fargo Center12,843
| 13–4
|- style="background:#fcc;"
| 18
| December 3
| @ Brooklyn
| 
| Danny Green (20)
| Tim Duncan (17)
| Tony Parker (6)
| Barclays Center15,989
| 13–5
|- style="background:#cfc;"
| 19
| December 5
| @ Memphis
| 
| Manu Ginóbili (17)
| Tim Duncan (10)
| Tim Duncan (10)
| FedExForum18,119
| 14–5
|- style="background:#cfc;"
| 20
| December 6
| Minnesota
| 
| Marco Belinelli (20)
| Tim Duncan (10)
| Marco Belinelli (6)
| AT&T Center18,581
| 15–5
|- style="background:#fcc;"
| 21
| December 9
| @ Utah
| 
| Tim Duncan (23)
| Tim Duncan (14)
| Manu Ginóbili (8)
| EnergySolutions Arena18,382
| 15–6
|- style="background:#cfc;"
| 22
| December 10
| New York
| 
| Marco Belinelli (22)
| Jeff Ayres (6)
| Cory Joseph (6)
| AT&T Center18,581
| 16–6
|- style="background:#fcc;"
| 23
| December 12
| L. A. Lakers
| 
| Tim Duncan, Danny Green (19)
| Tim Duncan (18)
| Cory Joseph (5)
| AT&T Center18,581
| 16–7
|- style="background:#cfc;"
| 24
| December 14
| @ Denver
| 
| Kawhi Leonard (18)
| Tim Duncan (9)
| Manu Ginóbili (6)
| Pepsi Center16,544
| 17–7
|- style="background:#fcc;"
| 25
| December 15
| @ Portland
| 
| Kawhi Leonard (21)
| Aron Baynes, Kawhi Leonard (9)
| Boris Diaw (9)
| Moda Center19,441
| 17–8
|- style="background:#fcc;"
| 26
| December 17
| Memphis
| 
| Danny Green (25)
| Tim Duncan (16)
| Manu Ginóbili (8)
| AT&T Center18,581
| 17–9
|- style="background:#fcc;"
| 27
| December 19
| Portland
| 
| Tim Duncan (32)
| Tim Duncan, Danny Green (10)
| Cory Joseph (7)
| AT&T Center18,581
| 17–10
|- style="background:#fcc;"
| 28
| December 20
| @ Dallas
| 
| Marco Belinelli (21)
| Aron Baynes (10)
| Boris Diaw (4)
| American Airlines Center20,504
| 17–11
|- style="background:#cfc;"
| 29
| December 22
| L.A. Clippers
| 
| Tony Parker (26)
| Tim Duncan (12)
| Manu Ginóbili (10)
| AT&T Center18,581
| 18–11
|- style="background:#fcc;"
| 30
| December 25
| Oklahoma City
| 
| Matt Bonner (17)
| Tiago Splitter, Manu Ginóbili (7)
| Manu Ginóbili (13)
| AT&T Center18,581
| 18–12
|- style="background:#fcc;"
| 31
| December 26
| @ New Orleans
| 
| Tim Duncan, Cory Joseph (20)
| Tim Duncan (11)
| Cory Joseph, Manu Ginóbili (5)
| Smoothie King Center18,376
| 18–13
|- style="background:#cfc;"
| 32
| December 28
| Houston
| 
| Danny Green (24)
| Tim Duncan (8)
| Cory Joseph, Manu Ginóbili (4)
| AT&T Center18,581
| 19–13
|- style="background:#fcc;"
| 33
| December 30
| @ Memphis
| 
| Marco Belinelli, Cory Joseph (18)
| Tim Duncan (10)
| Cory Joseph, Manu Ginóbili, Patty Mills (3)
| FedExForum18,119
| 19–14
|- style="background:#cfc;"
| 34
| December 31
| New Orleans
| 
| Manu Ginóbili (26)
| Tim Duncan (10)
| Tim Duncan (5)
| AT&T Center18,581
| 20–14

|- style="background:#cfc;"
| 35
| January 3
| Washington
| 
| Cory Joseph (19)
| Tim Duncan (9)
| Manu Ginóbili (5)
| AT&T Center18,581
| 21–14
|- style="background:#fcc;"
| 36
| January 6
| Detroit
| 
| Jeff Ayres (16)
| Tim Duncan, Tiago Splitter (9)
| Manu Ginóbili (8)
| AT&T Center18,581
| 21–15
|- style="background:#cfc;"
| 37
| January 9
| Phoenix
| 
| Danny Green (20)
| Tiago Splitter (14)
| Tim Duncan, Boris Diaw, Cory Joseph (5)
| AT&T Center18,581
| 22–15
|- style="background:#cfc;"
| 38
| January 10
| @ Minnesota
| 
| Austin Daye (22)
| Austin Daye (10)
| Cory Joseph (5)
| Target Center17,871
| 23–15
|- style="background:#fcc;"
| 39
| January 13
| @ Washington
| 
| Tony Parker (14)
| Tim Duncan (12)
| Cory Joseph, Manu Ginóbili (5)
| Verizon Center18,116
| 23–16
|- style="background:#cfc;"
| 40
| January 14
| @ Charlotte
| 
| Manu Ginóbili (27)
| Tim Duncan (10)
| Cory Joseph, Tony Parker (5)
| Time Warner Cable Arena17,309
| 24–16
|- style="background:#cfc;"
| 41
| January 16
| Portland
| 
| Kawhi Leonard (20)
| Tim Duncan (12)
| Manu Ginóbili, Tony Parker (7)
| AT&T Center18,581
| 25–16
|- style="background:#cfc;"
| 42
| January 18
| Utah
| 
| Tiago Splitter (14)
| Aron Baynes (11)
| Manu Ginóbili, Tim Duncan, Boris Diaw, Cory Joseph (4)
| AT&T Center18,581
| 26–16
|- style="background:#cfc;"
| 43
| January 20
| @ Denver
| 
| Tony Parker (18)
| Kawhi Leonard (15)
| Manu Ginóbili (8)
| Pepsi Center14,434
| 27–16
|- style="background:#fcc;"
| 44
| January 22
| @ Chicago
| 
| Kawhi Leonard (16)
| Tim Duncan, Tiago Splitter (7)
| Patty Mills (4)
| United Center21,648
| 27–17
|- style="background:#cfc;"
| 45
| January 23
| L. A. Lakers
| 
| Tony Parker (17)
| Kawhi Leonard (14)
| Tony Parker (4)
| AT&T Center18,581
| 28–17
|- style="background:#cfc;"
| 46
| January 25
| Milwaukee
| 
| Tim Duncan (20)
| Kawhi Leonard (14)
| Tony Parker (4) 
| AT&T Center18,581
| 29–17
|- style="background:#cfc;"
| 47
| January 28
| Charlotte
| 
| Tony Parker (17)
| Tim Duncan (14)
| Tony Parker (5)
| AT&T Center18,581
| 30–17
|- style="background:#fcc;"
| 48
| January 31
| L.A. Clippers
| 
| Kawhi Leonard (24)
| Tim Duncan (8)
| Tony Parker (8) 
| AT&T Center18,581
| 30–18

|- style="background:#cfc;"
| 49
| February 4
| Orlando
| 
| Tim Duncan (26)
| Tim Duncan (10)
| Manu Ginóbili (10)
| AT&T Center18,581
| 31–18
|- style="background:#cfc;"
| 50
| February 6
| Miami
| 
| Kawhi Leonard (24)
| Tim Duncan (12)
| Manu Ginóbili (9)
| AT&T Center18,581
| 32–18
|- style="background:#fcc;"
| 51
| February 8
| @ Toronto
| 
| Tim Duncan, Marco Belinelli (12)
| Tim Duncan (12)
| Tim Duncan (5)
| Air Canada Centre19,800
| 32–19
|- style="background:#cfc;"
| 52
| February 9
| @ Indiana
| 
| Tony Parker (19) 
| Danny Green (12)
| Tony Parker (6) 
| Bankers Life Fieldhouse16,691
| 33–19
|- style="background:#cfc;"
| 53
| February 11
| @ Detroit
| 
| Danny Green (19)
| Danny Green (8)
| Tony Parker (6) 
| The Palace of Auburn Hills14,617
| 34–19
|- align="center"
|colspan="9" bgcolor="#bbcaff"|All-Star Break
|- style="background:#fff;"
|- style="background:#fcc;"
| 54
| February 19
| @ L.A. Clippers
| 
| Tim Duncan (30)
| Tim Duncan (11)
| Tony Parker (13) 
| STAPLES Center19,358
| 34–20
|- style="background:#fcc;"
| 55
| February 20
| @ Golden State
| 
| Kawhi Leonard, Aron Baynes (12)
| Aron Baynes (10)
| Tony Parker (6)
| Oracle Arena19,596
| 34–21
|- style="background:#fcc;"
| 56
| February 23
| @ Utah
| 
| Tim Duncan (14)
| Tim Duncan (10)
| Tony Parker (4)
| EnergySolutions Arena18,782
| 34–22
|- style="background:#fcc;"
| 57
| February 25
| @ Portland
| 
| Tim Duncan (20)
| Tim Duncan, Kawhi Leonard (8)
| Tony Parker (4)
| Moda Center19,650
| 34–23
|- style="background:#cfc;"
| 58
| February 27
| @ Sacramento
| 
| Tony Parker (19)
| Tiago Splitter (9)
| Kawhi Leonard (5)
| Sleep Train Arena17,317
| 35–23
|- style="background:#cfc;"
| 59
| February 28
| @ Phoenix
| 
| Kawhi Leonard (22)
| Kawhi Leonard, Tim Duncan, Aron Baynes (10)
| Manu Ginóbili (7)
| US Airways Center18,055
| 36–23

|- style="background:#cfc;"
| 60
| March 4
| Sacramento
| 
| Kawhi Leonard (21)
| Aron Baynes (7)
| Tim Duncan (4)
| AT&T Center18,581
| 37–23
|- style="background:#cfc;"
| 61
| March 6
| Denver
| 
| Kawhi Leonard (25)
| Kawhi Leonard (8)
| Tony Parker (7)
| AT&T Center18,581
| 38–23
|- style="background:#cfc;"
| 62
| March 8
| Chicago
| 
| Kawhi Leonard (25)
| Kawhi Leonard, Tim Duncan (8) 
| Manu Ginóbili (4)
| AT&T Center18,581
| 39–23
|- style="background:#cfc;"
| 63
| March 10
| Toronto
| 
| Kawhi Leonard (24)
| Tim Duncan (13) 
| Tony Parker (9)
| AT&T Center18,581
| 40–23
|- style="background:#fcc;"
| 64
| March 12
| Cleveland
| 
| Tony Parker (31)
| Tim Duncan (11)
| Tim Duncan (8)
| AT&T Center18,581
| 40–24
|- style="background:#cfc;"
| 65
| March 15
| Minnesota
| 
| Kawhi Leonard (15)
| Boris Diaw (8)
| Tony Parker (8)
| AT&T Center18,581
| 41–24
|- style="background:#fcc;"
| 66
| March 17
| @ New York
| 
| Tony Parker (21)
| Tiago Splitter (13)
| Tony Parker (6)
| Madison Square Garden19,812
| 41–25
|- style="background:#cfc;"
| 67
| March 18
| @ Milwaukee
| 
| Danny Green (20)
| Danny Green (8)
| Tim Duncan (7)
| BMO Harris Bradley Center14,831
| 42–25
|- style="background:#cfc;"
| 68
| March 20
| Boston
| 
| Kawhi Leonard (22)
| Danny Green (7)
| Tony Parker (7)
| AT&T Center18,581
| 43–25
|- style="background:#cfc;"
| 69
| March 22
| @ Atlanta
| 
| Tiago Splitter (23)
| Kawhi Leonard (10)
| Kawhi Leonard, Tim Duncan (7) 
| Philips Arena19,193
| 44–25
|- style="background:#fcc;"
| 70
| March 24
| @ Dallas
| 
| Kawhi Leonard (19)
| Kawhi Leonard (9)
| Manu Ginóbili, Kawhi Leonard, Patty Mills, Tony Parker (3)
| American Airlines Center20,328
| 44–26
|- style="background:#cfc;"
| 71
| March 25
| Oklahoma City
| 
| Tony Parker (21)
| Jeff Ayres (8)
| Tony Parker (6)
| AT&T Center18,581
| 45–26
|- style="background:#cfc;"
| 72
| March 27
| Dallas
| 
| Boris Diaw (19)
| Tim Duncan (13)
| Manu Ginóbili (6)
| AT&T Center18,581
| 46–26
|- style="background:#cfc;"
| 73
| March 29
| Memphis
| 
| Kawhi Leonard (25)
| Kawhi Leonard (10)
| Tony Parker (6)
| AT&T Center18,581
| 47–26
|- style="background:#cfc;"
| 74
| March 31
| @ Miami
| 
| Kawhi Leonard (22)
| Tim Duncan (11)
| Tony Parker (5)
| American Airlines Arena20,047
| 48–26

|- style="background:#cfc;"
| 75
| April 1
| @ Orlando
| 
| Aron Baynes (18)
| Cory Joseph, Kawhi Leonard, Tiago Splitter (7)
| Boris Diaw, Tony Parker (4)
| Amway Center17,229
| 49–26
|- style="background:#cfc;"
| 76
| April 3
| Denver
| 
| Danny Green (21)
| Tim Duncan (7)
| Tony Parker (9) 
| AT&T Center18,581
| 50–26
|- style="background:#cfc;"
| 77
| April 5
| Golden State
| 
| Kawhi Leonard (26)
| Tim Duncan (7)
| Manu Ginóbili, Tony Parker (5)
| AT&T Center18,581
| 51–26
|- style="background:#cfc;"
| 78
| April 7
| @ Oklahoma City
| 
| Kawhi Leonard (26)
| Tim Duncan (9) 
| Boris Diaw, Cory Joseph (6)
| Chesapeake Energy Arena18,203
| 52–26
|- style="background:#cfc;"
| 79
| April 8
| Houston
| 
| Tony Parker (27)
| Aron Baynes (12)
| Cory Joseph (5)
| AT&T Center18,581
| 53–26
|- style="background:#cfc;"
| 80
| April 10
| @ Houston
| 
| Tim Duncan (29) 
| Tim Duncan (10)
| Manu Ginóbili, Danny Green, Boris Diaw (4)
| Toyota Center18,457
| 54–26
|- style="background:#cfc;"
| 81
| April 12
| Phoenix
| 
| Tim Duncan (22) 
| Tim Duncan (10) 
| Tony Parker (5)
| AT&T Center18,581
| 55–26
|- style="background:#fcc;"
| 82
| April 15
| @ New Orleans
| 
| Tony Parker (23)
| Kawhi Leonard, Tim Duncan (10)
| Tim Duncan, Tony Parker (6)
| Smoothie King Center18,524
| 55–27

Playoffs

|- style="background:#fbb;"
| 1
| April 19
| @ L. A. Clippers
| 
| Kawhi Leonard (18)
| Tim Duncan (11)
| Manu Ginóbili (6)
| STAPLES Center19,309
| 0–1
|- style="background:#bfb;"
| 2
| April 22
| @ L. A. Clippers
| 
| Tim Duncan (28)
| Tim Duncan (11)
| Boris Diaw (6)
| STAPLES Center19,482
| 1–1
|- style="background:#bfb;"
| 3
| April 24
| L. A. Clippers
| 
| Kawhi Leonard (32)
| Tim Duncan (7)
| Manu Ginóbili (6)
| AT&T Center18,581
| 2–1
|- style="background:#fbb;"
| 4
| April 26
| L.A. Clippers
| 
| Kawhi Leonard (26)
| Tim Duncan (14) 
| Kawhi Leonard (6)
| AT&T Center18,581
| 2–2
|- style="background:#bfb;"
| 5
| April 28
| @ L.A. Clippers
| 
| Tim Duncan (21) 
| Tim Duncan (14) 
| Manu Ginóbili (6)
| STAPLES Center19,571
| 3–2
|- style="background:#fbb;"
| 6
| April 30
| L.A. Clippers
| 
| Marco Belinelli (23)
| Tim Duncan (13)
| Tony Parker (7)
| AT&T Center18,581
| 3–3
|- style="background:#fbb;"
| 7
| May 2
| @ L.A. Clippers
| 
| Tim Duncan (27)
| Tim Duncan (11)
| Manu Ginóbili (7)
| STAPLES Center19,588
| 3–4

Player statistics

Regular season

Playoffs

Transactions

Free agency

Re-signed

Additions

Subtractions

Awards

References

External links
 2014–15 San Antonio Spurs preseason at ESPN
 2014–15 San Antonio Spurs regular season at ESPN
 2014–15 San Antonio Spurs postseason at ESPN

San Antonio Spurs seasons
San Antonio Spurs
San Antonio
San Antonio